This is a list of yearly Western Athletic Conference football standings.

WAC standings

References

Western Athletic Conference
Standings